Camarines Norte, officially the Province of Camarines Norte (Bikol: Probinsya kan Amihanan na Camarines (Camarines Norte)), is a province in the Philippines located in the Bicol Region in Luzon. Its capital is Daet. The province borders Quezon to the west, Camarines Sur to the south, and the Philippine Sea to the north. It has historically been a Bikol-speaking region. However, there has been a language shift in recent years to Tagalog, which is more commonly used nowadays.

History
In 1573, Bicol province was founded. From Bicol, the province of Camarines was created in 1636, which was divided in 1829, creating Camarines Norte and Camarines Sur. They were briefly merged from 1854 to 1857 into Ambos Camarines (ambos is Spanish for "both"). They were merged into Ambos Camarines once again in 1893. The province was divided into Camarines Norte and Camarines Sur once again in 1917.

When Camarines Norte was separated from Ambos Camarines in 1829, it was assigned the towns of Daet, as capital, Talisay, Indan (now Vinzons), Labo, Paracale, Mambulao (now Jose Panganiban), Capalonga, Ragay, Lupi and Sipocot.

Seventeen years later, it lost Sipocot, Lupi and Ragay to Camarines Sur in exchange for the town of Siruma.

Spanish period

Spanish conquistador Juan de Salcedo, dispatched by Legazpi to explore the island in 1571, influenced the existence of Camarines Norte. After subduing Taytay and Cainta, he marched further across Laguna and Tayabas.

He visited the rich gold-laden town of Mambulao and Paracale, obsessed by them about which he heard from natives there of existing gold mines.

When Francisco de Sande took over from Legazpi as Governor General, Spanish influence started to be felt in the region. He established a permanent Spanish garrison in Naga to control the region and defend it from Chinese and Muslim pirates. Capt. Pedro de Chavez was assigned to head this force.

Native settlements, which include Mambulao and Paracale, were already thriving when the Spaniards arrived. Indan and Daet were the other settlements besides Capalonga. But Paracale remained the most sought after because of its gold mines. 

The towns were chiefly inhabited by Tagalogs; the rests were of Visayan strain. However, most of the immigrants were from Mauban, Quezon. The Spanish missionaries established missions to Christianize the natives.

Daet Revolt

April 14–17, 1898 - Local members of the Katipunan led by Ildefonso Moreno and other patriots staged an uprising against the Spanish authorities here who have fortified themselves in the house of one Florencio Arana, a Spanish merchant and a long time resident of Daet. Sporadic encounters started on April 14 until April 16 when the rebels occupied Daet and surrounded the Spaniards in the house of Arana. But the Katipuneros failed to repulse the reinforcements which arrived in Barra (now Mercedes) from Nueva Caceres on April 17. Said reinforcements broke the siege of Daet. This resulted in the death and/or execution of many patriots, including Ildefonso Moreno, Tomas Zaldua and his two sons, Jose Abaño, Domingo Lozada and Aniceto Gregorio, among others. While the Daet revolt collapsed, it signaled the start of a series of rebellion throughout the Bicol region.

By virtue of Act 2809 of March 3, 1919, Governor General F. B. Harrison separated Camarines Norte from Camarines Sur with the installation of Don Miguel R. Lukban as its first governor. "In functional sense, April 15, 1920, was the date of the organization of Camarines Norte, as directed by Executive Order No. 22 dated March 20, 1920, in conformity with the provisions of Act No. 2809," according to Serafin D. Quiason, former chairman of the National Historical Institute (NHI).

First guerrilla encounter

The first guerrilla encounter in the Philippines during the second world war in the Pacific occurred on December 18, 1941 – 11 days after the Japanese bombing of Pearl Harbor in Hawaii on Dec. 7, 1941 and 10 days after the attack on Clark Airbase in Pampanga on Dec. 8, 1941 - at Laniton, Basud, Camarines Norte when the Vinzons guerrilla group with some elements of USAFFE units engaged the vanguard of the Japanese Imperial Army advancing towards Daet, the capital town. A shrine was put up in Laniton to mark this historic feat of arms while surviving veterans and the sons and daughters of veterans who fell commemorate this event every Dec. 18 in Basud and Daet under the auspices of the Veterans Federation of the Philippines – Camarines Norte Chapter (VFP-CN), Basud Municipal Government and the Provincial Government.

Japanese Occupation and Liberation
The general headquarters of Philippine Commonwealth Army started their operations on January 3, 1942. The Philippine Constabulary in Camarines Norte was then established on October 28, 1944. When the U.S. liberation forces returned to the province in 1945, they helped the local Filipino troops and Bicolano guerrillas in the liberation from the Japanese Imperial forces.

Martial law 

On the evening of September 23, 1972, President Ferdinand Marcos announced on television that he had placed the Philippienes, including Camarines Norte, under martial law.  The marked the beginning of a 9-year period of one-man rule (1972-1981). Even though Martial Law was formally lifted on January 17, 1981, Marcos retained essentially all of his powers as dictator until he was deposed by the February 1986 People Power revolution.

On June 14, 1982 Marcos administration forces opened fire on protesters from different barrios, who were marching to demand an increase in copra prices, and to denounce "fake elections" and Cocofed. Four people died on the spot, and at least 50 were injured. Two of those who were seriously wounded died two months later.  This has come to be known as the "1981 Daet massacre," and four of those killed have since been honored by having their names engraved on the Wall of Remembrance at the Bantayog ng mga Bayani memorial.

Geography
Camarines Norte covers a total area of  occupying the northwestern coast of the Bicol Peninsula in the southeastern section of Luzon.

One of the six provinces comprising Region V (Bicol), it is bounded on the northeast by the Philippine Sea, east by the San Miguel Bay, west by the Lamon Bay, southwest by Quezon province, and southeast by Camarines Sur.

Climate

Administrative divisions
Camarines Norte is subdivided into two legislative districts comprising a total of 12 municipalities.

Demographics

Religion
The majority of the population are followers of Roman Catholic church with 93% of the population adherence, while the rest of the people's faith is divided by several Christian groups such as Iglesia Filipina Independiente or Aglipayan Church, Iglesia ni Cristo (INC), Baptists, Methodists, Mormons, Jehovah's Witnesses, Seventh-day Adventist, other Christians and also Muslims which demographic is mostly traced to Mindanao.

Prior to colonization, the region had a complex religious system which involved various deities. Among these deities include: Gugurang, the supreme god who dwells inside of Mount Mayon where he guards and protects the sacred fire in which Aswang, his brother was trying to steal. Whenever people disobey his orders, wishes and commit numerous sins, he would cause Mount Mayon to burst lava as a sign of warning for people to mend their crooked ways. Ancient Bikolanos had a rite performed for him called Atang.; Asuang, the evil god who always tries to steal the sacred fire of Mount Mayon from his brother, Gugurang. Addressed sometimes as Aswang, he dwells mainly inside Mount Malinao. As an evil god, he would cause the people to suffer misfortunes and commit sins. Enemy of Gugurang and a friend of Bulan the god of the moon; Haliya, the masked goddess of the moonlight and the arch-enemy of Bakunawa and protector of Bulan. Her cult is composed primarily of women. There is also a ritual dance named after her as it is performed to be a counter-measure against Bakunawa.; Bulan, the god of the pale moon, he is depicted as a pubescent boy with uncommon comeliness that made savage beast and the vicious mermaids (Magindara) tame. He has deep affection towards Magindang, but plays with him by running away so that Magindang would never catch him. The reason for this is because he is shy to the man that he loves. If Magindang manages to catch Bulan, Haliya always comes to free him from Magindang's grip; Magindang, the god of the sea and all its creatures. He has deep affection to the lunar god Bulan and pursues him despite never catching him. Due to this, the Bicolanos reasoned that it is to why the waves rise to reach the moon when seen from the distant horizon. Whenever he does catch up to Bulan, Haliya comes to rescue Bulan and free him immediately; Okot, god of forest and hunting; and Bakunawa,  a gigantic sea serpent deity who is often considered as the cause of eclipses, the devourer of the sun and the moon, and an adversary of Haliya as Bakunawa's main aim is to swallow Bulan, who Haliya swore to protect for all of eternity.

Language
The Central Bikol dialect has historically been the main language spoken in the province. Tagalog is slowly taking over as the most common language and English is also widely understood and used in businesses and education. The Manide language is also spoken in minority by the Manide indigenous peoples, concentrated mainly on the towns of Jose Panganiban, Labo, and Paracale.

Economy

The province's economy largely depends on agriculture, with grain crops, vegetables, coconuts, root crops and fruits, but they are well known with  small sweet pineapple .

The four major manufacturing and processing industries in the province are mining (particularly gold and iron ore), jewelry craft, pineapple and coconut industry.

Other sources of the province's economical stability are from the growth of numbers in terms of tourists. The province offers various attractions for foreign people, i.e. beaches, mountains, and religious places. Due to the sudden increments, the province's economy will continue to grow and expand for further improvements to caters to the likes of people.

Infrastructure
The province has an international seaport located at Barangay Osmeña, Jose Panganiban town servicing one of its major industries, Pan Century Surfactants.

The province has 13 fishing ports in the coastal municipalities and one feeder airport in Bagasbas, Daet.

Festivals and Events 
The Bantayog Festival

The Bantayog Festival is a historical commemorating festival in Camarines Norte that features the first Rizal monument which is also the centerpiece of the celebration held simultaneous with the foundation anniversary of the province. The Bantayog Festival is also celebrated in each town of the province with their own festivals such as the “Pinayasan” in Daet; “Palayogan” (from the root word Palay and Niyog) in Santa Elena; “Babakasin” in Vinzonz; “Pabirik ng Bayan” in Paracale town; and the “Mananap” in San Vicente.

Bantayog Climb

The Bantayog climb is an annual event organized by Oryol Outdoor Group Inc. as part of the activities during Bantayog Festival.

The Pineapple (pinyasan) Festival

Pinyasan (Pineapple) Festival showcases Camarines Norte's premier agri-product which is the sweetest pineapple called Formosa.
 Summer Surf Fest
 Annual Kiteboarding Competition
 Paragliding and Hang-gliding Towing Competition
Gold-panning or Pabirik Festival

The Pabirik Festival is a week long celebration which commemorates the past culture, traditions, history and customs of Paracale considered as a gold town of Camarines Norte. A highlight of the Pabirik Festival gives emphasis on its rich mining industry while showcasing its gold products all of which are available in the municipality. Pabirik means “pan” which is a medium used by the natives of Paracale in gold panning.

Palong Festival

The Palong festival coincides with the feast of the Black Nazarene and is celebrated through street dancing and an agro-industrial fair to which the natives express their gratitude for the abundance of ornamental plants known as rooster combs or “palong manok”.

Kadagatan Festival

The Kadagatan festival is celebrated by fishermen to give respect, express gratitude and recognize Mother Nature for the vast marine resources the town of Mercedes are blessed with.

Busig-on Festival

The Busig-on festival is based on the epic of the hero Busig-on who hails from Labo town and also of Bicolano values. The festival is a showcase of talent and skills in a competitive manner while showing the town's places of interest and featuring the town's unique historical values.

Mambulawan Festival

Held to coincide with the Feast of Our Lady of the Most Holy Rosary, the festival aims to forge unity and cooperation among the local community, promote culture and arts, revitalization of mining industry, exposition of the town''s best, homecoming and involvement of Balikbayans, all geared towards advancement and economic growth.

Notable people from Camarines Norte

 José María Panganiban — Bicolano propagandist, linguist, and essayist. He is one of the main writers and contributors for La Solidaridad, writing under the pen names "Jomapa" and "J.M.P."
 Gen. Vicente R. Lukban — officer in Emilio Aguinaldo's staff during the Philippine Revolution and the politico-military chief of Samar and Leyte during the Philippine–American War. On September 28, 1901, Sunday, he led Filipino rebels, armed only with bolos and sharpened bamboo poles, in an attack against the contingent of American forces in Balangiga, Samar. Only 36 troopers of Company C, 9th Infantry Regiment of the US Forces survived the attack against 16 casualties among the Filipino rebels, giving the encounter its famous label "Balangiga Massacre" in Philippine history.
 Wenceslao Q. Vinzons, Sr. — Lawyer, orator, labor leader, writer, youngest delegate to the 1935 Constitutional Convention and youngest signatory of the Charter at the age of 25. As the governor in 1940 and congressman-elect in 1941 and refusing to surrender, he evacuated the provincial government during the Japanese occupation to the hinterlands of Labo and led a guerrilla force against the Japanese forces.
Manuel Conde — legendary film actor, director, producer, and National Artist of the Philippines.
Ricky Lee — screenwriter, journalist, novelist, playwright, and National Artist of the Philippines.
 Robin Padilla — Senator in the 19th Congress, actor
Liwayway Vinzons-Chato — former Bureau of Internal Revenue commissioner and Lone District of Camarines Norte congresswoman.
Jammer Jamito — Philippine Basketball Association player for the Meralco Bolts.
Justin Arana — Philippine Basketball Association player for the Converge FiberXers.

See also
 List of Bicol Region Cities and Municipalities

References

External links

 
 
 Official Camarines Norte website 

 
Provinces of the Philippines
Provinces of the Bicol Region
States and territories established in 1829
1829 establishments in the Philippines